An indaba is an important conference held by the izinDuna (principal men) of the Zulu and Xhosa peoples of South Africa. (Such meetings are also practiced by the Swazi, who refer to them using the close cognate .) Indabas may include only the izinDuna of a particular community, or they may be held with representatives of other communities.

The term "Indaba" comes from the Zulu and Xhosa languages. It means "business" or "matter".

References

Zulu culture
Xhosa culture
Swazi culture
Languages of South Africa
Zulu words and phrases
South African English
Meetings